Alistra radleyi is a species of spider of the genus Alistra. It is endemic to Sri Lanka.

See also
 List of Hahniidae species

References

Endemic fauna of Sri Lanka
Hahniidae
Spiders of Asia
Spiders described in 1898